Nigvziani Badrijani is a Georgian dish made with fried eggplant stuffed with spiced walnut and garlic paste. It is often topped with pomegranate seeds.

Preparation 
Salted eggplants are sliced lengthwise, pressed to remove the bitter juice, left to rest. They are then fried in oil and refrigerated. The filling is prepared by blending walnuts, garlic, coriander, cayenne pepper, salt, fenugreek and vinegar with water in a food processor to give a puree, which is then seasoned. The fried eggplants and the stuffing are left to chill separately, and are assembled just a couple of hours before serving. To assemble, a layer of stuffing is placed on each piece of eggplant, which is then rolled up tightly. Badrijani can be garnished with red onions, coriander or pomegranate seed to serve.

See also
 List of stuffed dishes
Georgian cuisine

References

Cuisine of Georgia (country)
Eggplant dishes
Stuffed vegetable dishes